Carolyn Ruth Bertozzi (born October 10, 1966) is an American chemist and Nobel laureate, known for her wide-ranging work spanning both chemistry and biology. She coined the term "bioorthogonal chemistry" for chemical reactions compatible with living systems. Her recent efforts include synthesis of chemical tools to study cell surface sugars called glycans and how they affect diseases such as cancer, inflammation, and viral infections like COVID-19.  At Stanford University, she holds the Anne T. and Robert M. Bass Professorship in the School of Humanities and Sciences. Bertozzi is also an Investigator at the Howard Hughes Medical Institute (HHMI) and is the former Director of the Molecular Foundry, a nanoscience research center at Lawrence Berkeley National Laboratory.

She received the MacArthur "genius" award at age 33. In 2010, she was the first woman to receive the prestigious Lemelson-MIT Prize faculty award. She is a member of the National Academy of Sciences (2005), the Institute of Medicine (2011), and the National Academy of Inventors (2013). In 2014, it was announced that Bertozzi would lead ACS Central Science, the American Chemical Society's first peer-reviewed open access journal, which offers all content free to the public. Since 2021 she has been a member of the Accademia dei Lincei.
As an open lesbian in academia and science, Bertozzi has been a role model for students and colleagues.

Bertozzi was awarded the 2022 Nobel Prize in Chemistry, jointly with Morten P. Meldal and Karl Barry Sharpless, "for the development of click chemistry and bioorthogonal chemistry".

Education 

Carolyn Bertozzi received her A.B. summa cum laude in chemistry from Harvard University, where she worked with Professor Joe Grabowski on the design and construction of a photoacoustic calorimeter. While an undergraduate, she played in several bands, notably Bored of Education with future Rage Against the Machine guitarist Tom Morello. After graduating from Harvard in 1988, she worked at Bell Labs with Chris Chidsey.

Bertozzi completed her Ph.D. in chemistry at University of California, Berkeley in 1993 with Mark Bednarski, working on the chemical synthesis of oligosaccharide analogs. While at Berkeley, she discovered that viruses can bind to sugars in the body. The discovery led to her field of research, glycobiology. During Bertozzi's third year of graduate school, Bednarski was diagnosed with colon cancer, which resulted in him taking a leave of absence and changing his career path by enrolling in medical school. This left Bertozzi and the rest of the lab to complete their Ph.D. work with no direct supervision.

Career and research
After graduating from Berkeley with a Ph.D., Bertozzi was a postdoctoral fellow at University of California, San Francisco (UCSF) with Steven Rosen, where she studied the activity of endothelial oligosaccharides in promoting cell adhesion at inflammation sites. While working with Rosen at UCSF, Bertozzi was able to modify the protein and sugar molecules in the walls of living cells so that the cells accept foreign materials such as implants.

In 1996 Bertozzi became a faculty member in the UC Berkeley College of Chemistry and a faculty scientist at Lawrence Berkeley National Laboratory, where she served as the Director of the Molecular Foundry. She has been an investigator with HHMI since 2000. In 1999, while working with HHMI and at Berkeley, she founded the field of bioorthogonal chemistry and coined the term in 2003.  This new field and technique allows researchers to chemically modify molecules in living organisms and not interrupt the processes of the cell. In 2015, Bertozzi moved to Stanford University to join the ChEM-H Institute.

Bertozzi studies the glycobiology of underlying diseases such as cancer, inflammatory disorders such as arthritis, and infectious diseases such as tuberculosis. In particular, Bertozzi has advanced the understanding of cell surface oligosaccharides involved in cell recognition and inter-cellular communication.  Bertozzi has applied the techniques of bioorthogonal chemistry to study glycocalyx, the sugars that surround the cell membrane. Her discoveries have advanced the field of biotherapeutics. Her lab has also developed tools for research. One such development is creating chemical tools for studying glycans in living systems. Her lab's development of nanotechnologies which probe biological systems lead to the development of a fast point-of-care tuberculosis test in 2018. In 2017, due to her lab's discovery of linking the sugars on the surface of cancer cells and their ability to avoid the immune system defenses, she was invited to speak at Stanford's TED talk, giving a talk entitled "What the sugar coating on your cells is trying to tell you".

Biotechnology startups
In 2001, Bertozzi and Steve Rosen co-founded Thios Pharmaceuticals in Emeryville, California, the first company to target sulfation pathways. This Pharmaceuticals dissolved in 2005.

In 2008, Bertozzi founded a startup of her own: Redwood Bioscience also in Emeryville, California. Redwood Bioscience is a biotechnology company that uses SMARTag, a site-specific protein modification technology that allows small drugs to attach to sites on the proteins and can be used to help fight cancers. Redwood Bioscience was acquired by Catalent Pharma Solutions in 2014. Bertozzi remains a part of the advisory board for the biologics sector of the company.

In 2014, she co-founded Enable Biosciences of South San Francisco, California. It focuses on biotechnologies for at-home diagnoses for type 1 diabetes, HIV, and other diseases.

Bertozzi became a co-founder of Palleon Pharma of Waltham, Massachusetts, in 2015. Palleon Pharma focuses on investigating glycoimmune checkpoint inhibitors as a potential treatment for cancer.

In 2017, Bertozzi helped found InterVenn Biosciences, which uses mass spectrometry and artificial intelligence to enhance glycoproteomics for target and biomarker discovery, ovarian cancer diagnostics, and predicting the successes and failures of clinical trials.

She co-founded Grace Science Foundation in 2018. The foundation focuses on curing NGLY1 deficiency through developing therapeutics that are efficient and inexpensive.

In 2019, she co-founded both OliLux Biosciences and Lycia Therapeutics. OliLux Biosciences develops new methods for tuberculosis detection. The founding of Lycia Therapeutics occurred when Bertozzi's group discovered lysosome-targeting chimeras (LYTACs). The new molecule class may be able to degrade some cardiovascular disease and cancer targets.  Lycia Therapeutics focuses on developing technology which utilizes lysosome-targeting chimeras (LYTACs).

Bertozzi also previously served on the research advisory board of several pharmaceutical companies including GlaxoSmithKline, and until recently Eli Lilly.

Publications
Bertozzi has over 600 publications on Web of Science; the most cited are:

Awards and honors

1987 – Phi Beta Kappa
1997 – Alfred P. Sloan Research Fellowship
1997 – Horace S. Isbell Award in Carbohydrate Chemistry
1998 – Glaxo Wellcome Scholars' Award
1998 – Beckman Young Investigators Award
1999 – Arthur C. Cope Scholar Award of the American Chemical Society
1999 – Camille Dreyfus Teacher-Scholar Award
1999 – MacArthur Fellowship
2000 – Presidential Early Career Award for Scientists and Engineers
2000 – Merck Academic Development Program Award
2001 – UC Berkeley Distinguished Teaching Award
2001 – ACS Award in Pure Chemistry
2001 – Donald Sterling Noyce Prize for Excellence in Undergraduate Teaching
2001 – Fellow of the American Association for the Advancement of Science.
2002 – Irving Sigal Young Investigator Award of the Protein Society
2003 – Fellow of the American Academy of Arts and Sciences
2004 – Agnes Fay Morgan Research Award of Iota Sigma Pi 
2005 – Havinga Medal, Univ. Leiden 
2005 – Member of the National Academy of Sciences
2005 – T.Z. and Irmgard Chu Distinguished Professorship in Chemistry
2007 – Ernst Schering Prize
2007 – LGBTQ Scientist of the Year Award – from the National Organization of Gay and Lesbian Scientists and Technical Professionals
2008 – Li Ka Shing Women in Science Award
2008 – Roy L. Whistler International Award in Carbohydrate Chemistry
2008 – Member of the German Academy of Sciences Leopoldina
2008 – Willard Gibbs Award
2009 – William H. Nichols Medal
2009 – Harrison Howe Award
2009 – Albert Hofmann Medal, Univ. Zurich
2010 – Lemelson-MIT Prize 
2010 – Royal Society of Chemistry – Organic Division, Bioorganic Chemistry Award
2011 – Member of the Institute of Medicine
2011 – Tetrahedron Young Investigator Award for Bioorganic and Medicinal Chemistry
2011 – Emanuel Merck Lectureship
2012 – Honorary Doctorate of Science from Brown University
2012 – Heinrich Wieland Prize
2013 – Elected Fellow of the National Academy of Inventors
2013 – Hans Bloemendal Award
2015 – UCSF 150th Anniversary Alumni Excellence Awards
2017 – Arthur C. Cope Award
2018 – Foreign Member of the Royal Society (ForMemRS)
2020 – John J. Carty Award for the Advancement of Science
2020 – Chemistry for the Future Solvay Prize
2020 – F. A. Cotton Medal for Excellence in Chemical Research
2022 – Wolf Prize in Chemistry
2022 – Dr H. P. Heineken Prize for Biochemistry and Biophysics
2022 – Welch Award in Chemistry
2022 – Bijvoet Medal of the Bijvoet Centre for Biomolecular Research of Utrecht University
 2022 -  Lifetime Mentor Award, American Association for the Advancement of Science.
2022 – Nobel Prize in Chemistry
2023 - Roger Adams Award

Personal life
Bertozzi grew up in Lexington, Massachusetts, the daughter of the late Norma Gloria (Berringer) and William Bertozzi. Her father was of Italian descent. Her maternal grandparents were from Nova Scotia, Canada. She has two sisters, one of whom, Andrea Bertozzi, is on the mathematics faculty at the University of California, Los Angeles. Her father was a physics professor at the Massachusetts Institute of Technology.

Bertozzi is a lesbian and has been out since the late 1980s. She has a wife and three sons.

References

External links

  of Bertozzi Research Group
 What the sugar coating on your cells is trying to tell you – TED Talk

 
Bertozzi's et al. publication list

1966 births
21st-century American women
21st-century American LGBT people
21st-century American chemists
American women chemists
Bijvoet Medal recipients
Fellows of the American Academy of Arts and Sciences
Fellows of the American Academy of Microbiology
Foreign Members of the Royal Society
Harvard College alumni
Howard Hughes Medical Investigators
American people of Italian descent
Lawrence Berkeley National Laboratory people
LGBT academics
LGBT Nobel laureates
LGBT people from Massachusetts
American LGBT scientists
Living people
MacArthur Fellows
Members of the German Academy of Sciences Leopoldina
Members of the National Academy of Medicine
Members of the United States National Academy of Sciences
Nobel laureates in Chemistry
Recipients of the Presidential Early Career Award for Scientists and Engineers
Stanford University Department of Chemistry faculty
UC Berkeley College of Chemistry alumni
UC Berkeley College of Chemistry faculty
University of California, San Francisco alumni
Women Nobel laureates